Urban Zemmer (born 4 July 1970) is an Italian male sky runner, world champion in the vertical kilometer at the 2010 Skyrunning World Championships.

Biography
In the specialty of the vertical kilometer he also won the European championships in 2009 and Italian championships in 2009, 2010, 2011,

National titles
Italian Vertical Kilometer Championships (FISKY version)
Vertical kilometer: 2011

References

External links
Urban Zemmer profile at Accapi

1970 births
Living people
Italian sky runners
Skyrunning World Championships winners